Chronic Breakdown a studio album released by the Washington, D.C.-based go-go band the Huck-A-Bucks on December 12, 1995. This was the band's debut album, and consists of twelve tracks including the song "Sexy Girl" which was sampled by hip-hop recording artist Wale for the 2006 single "Breakdown".

Track listing

Personnel 
Adapted from AllMusic.

Darryl Arrington – drums
DeCarlos Cunningham – keyboards
Rob "R.J." Folson – keyboards
Sequan Jones – congas, percussion
Lamont Ray – percussion, vocals
Felix Stevenson – drums
Joseph Timms – rapping, vocals
Charles Yancy – percussion, vocals
Roy Battle – engineer, producer

References 

1995 debut albums
Huck-A-Bucks albums